Yggdrasil is the world tree of Norse mythology.

Yggdrasil may also refer to:

Arts and entertainment 
 Yggdrasil (band), a folk band from the Faroe Islands
 Yggdrasil (album), an album by Japanese rock band Bump of Chicken
 "Yggdrasil", a Digimon Data Squad episode

Fictional characters and locations 
 Mithos Yggdrasill, a character in the video game Tales of Symphonia
 The name of the computer that orders the attack on Gloire in the video game Silpheed
 A computer system used to run reality in the manga series Oh My Goddess!
 A sand cruiser in the video game Xenogears, later modified into the Yggdrasil II and Yggdrasil III
 Yggdrasill Corporation, a fictional entity in the tokusatsu series Kamen Rider Gaim
 Yggdrasil Labyrinth, the setting of the video game series Etrian Odyssey
 The name of the game in which the anime series Overlord is set
 The mythical world tree featured in the role-playing video game series Dragon Quest
 A spaceship in the Hyperion novels

Other uses 
 Yggdrasil Linux/GNU/X, an early Linux distribution (a computer operating system)